Dwayne Sweeney (born 8 August 1984) is a New Zealand rugby union player who is signed for Waikato in the Mitre 10 Cup. His usual position is centre, although he is also comfortable at both wing and fullback.
Sweeney is also an accurate goal kicker.

Career
Sweeney was a member of the Chiefs Wider Training Group in 2006 and was then selected in the squad for 2007 and 2008. He impressed at provincial level in 2006 for the inaugural Air New Zealand Cup 2006 champions Waikato. In 2008 he was selected for the NZ Maori rugby team and made his debut at the 2007 Churchill Cup tournament in England.

In 2015 Sweeney was named in the Barbarians side that played Samoa at Olympic Stadium in London. He lined up with former All Blacks Adam Thomson, Ali Williams and Carl Hayman. Springbok great Bakkies Botha captained the side.

References

External links
 All Blacks profile
 

1984 births
Living people
New Zealand rugby union players
Rugby union fullbacks
Rugby union centres
Chiefs (rugby union) players
Waikato rugby union players
Māori All Blacks players
Rugby union players from Hamilton, New Zealand
Expatriate rugby union players in Japan
New Zealand expatriate sportspeople in Japan
People educated at Hamilton Boys' High School
Kyuden Voltex players
Munakata Sanix Blues players